See You at Regis Debray is a 2005 film written and directed by C.S. Leigh and starring Lars Eidinger as the film's only character. Set in 1969, the film sees Andreas Baader hiding in Régis Debray's (who was imprisoned in Bolivia at the time) apartment in Paris. It contains only ten scenes. The film features an original score by Japanese experimental musician Ryoji Ikeda. It also features Leonard Cohen's song "Hey, That's No Way to Say Goodbye".

References

External links
 

2005 films
2005 drama films
British drama films
Films set in Paris
Films set in 1969
2000s British films